The 1992 CAF Cup was the first football club tournament season that took place for the runners-up of each African country's domestic league. It was won by Shooting Stars in two-legged final victory against Nakivubo Villa.

First round

|}

Second round

|}

Quarter-finals

|}

Semi-finals

|}

Final

|}

Winners

External links
CAF Cup 1992 - rsssf.com

3
1992